Laviana is one of thirteen parishes (administrative divisions) in the Gozón municipality, within the province and autonomous community of Asturias, in northern Spain.

The population is 530 (INE 2008).

Villages and hamlets
 Campo de la Iglesia
 Endasa
 San Juan de Nieva
 Zeluán

References

Parishes in Gozón